The Fresh Faces is an American child dance group from Phoenix, Arizona who reached the quarter-finals on America's Got Talent. It consists of five dancers from Club Dance Studio:  Brynn Rumfallo, Jaycee Wilkins, Bostyn Brown, Jenna Valenzuela, and Dylynn Jones.

Career

In 2013, Alexa Moffett formed the group to compete on America's Got Talent. In 2015, the short-lived group split up to pursue solo careers in the entertainment industry.

Filmography

References

American female dancers
Dancers from Arizona
Artists from Phoenix, Arizona
Participants in American reality television series